Barkin  may refer to:
 Barkin, surname of Hebrew origin
 Barkin, surname of Basque origin
 Barkin Ladi, a local government area in Nigeria

See also
 Barkin' Bill Smith, an American singer